Everingham is a surname. Notable people with the surname include:

Ananda Everingham (born 1982), Thai actor
Doug Everingham (born 1923), Australian politician
John Everingham (born 1949), Australian journalist
Matthew James Everingham (1769–1817), convict
Paul Everingham (born 1943), Australian politician